This Too Shall Pass is the debut album by Israeli rapper Tuna, which released on August 6, 2015, by Israeli record label Anana.

The first single and titular track from the album "Gam Zeh Ya'avor" reached the top of Media Forest weekly chart.

This Too Shall Pass features guest appearances from Ravid Plotnik, Shlomi Saranga and Shi 360, among others.

Track listing

References 

Tuna (rapper) albums
Hebrew-language albums
2015 debut albums